Fred Pletsch is currently serving as analyst on FSN Detroit's college hockey coverage. Additionally he was commissioner for the Central Collegiate Hockey Association.

In his broadcasting career he also has been the play-by-play announcer for the NHL's Ottawa Senators and the AHL affiliate of the Colorado Avalanche.

He was also the commissioner of the North American Hockey League (junior "A") for three seasons. Pletsch is a longtime active member of the Detroit Sports Broadcasters Association, founded in 1948 by pioneer Tigers announcer Ty Tyson.

Fred Pletsch has four children and lives with his wife Kelly in Michigan. He is the son-in-law of former Buffalo Sabres announcer Ted Darling.

External links
 Fred Pletsch at CCHA

References

Canadian television sportscasters
Central Collegiate Hockey Association commissioners
Living people
National Hockey League broadcasters
North American Hockey League
People from Chatham-Kent
Toronto Metropolitan University alumni
Year of birth missing (living people)
Sportspeople from Detroit
Place of birth missing (living people)